Dhaka Metro Rail, colloquially known as the Dhaka Metro is a mass rapid transit (MRT) system serving Dhaka, Bangladesh. Together with the city's proposed subway system, it is expected to reduce congestion in the capital. It is a part of the 20-year long Strategic Transport Plan (STP) outlined by the Dhaka Transport Coordination Authority (DTCA).

The first phase of Dhaka Metro's MRT Line 6 commenced commercial operations on 28 December 2022, after being inaugurated by Prime Minister Sheikh Hasina, with metro services being available to general commuters the next day. The construction of MRT Line 6's second phase is scheduled to be completed by 2023. The third phase will contain an additional 1.16 km extension at Kamalapur railway station which will have an interchange with MRT Line 1, MRT Line 2 and MRT Line 4 and is set to be completed by 2025. The network is planned to contain six lines. Of these, two are under construction, with the rest still in the planning stages.

History 
In an effort to implement Dhaka's 20-year-long Strategic Transport Plan (STP), the Government of Bangladesh invited the Japan International Cooperation Agency (JICA) to conduct a primary survey and feasibility study on the transport system of Dhaka in 2009–2010. In 2012, the Government's Executive Committee of National Economic Council (ECNEC) approved the project. A loan agreement between the Bangladeshi government and JICA was signed in January 2013.

Dhaka Mass Transit Company Limited (DMTC), the agency responsible for the implementation of the first metro line (MRT Line-6) was formed in January 2013. The General Consultant (GC), namely the NKDM Association, commenced work beginning in February 2014. In June 2013, Dhaka Mass Transit Company Limited (DMTC) was established by the Government to implement the Metro Rail Lines across the city.

History of MRT Line-6

Construction 

The deal for construction of the MRT Line-6, costing US$2.8 billion, was signed by the Government of Bangladesh with the Japan International Cooperation Agency on 20 February 2013. Construction began on 26 June 2016 with an inauguration ceremony presided over by the prime minister Sheikh Hasina. Civil engineering work was done by the Italian-Thai Development Public Company Ltd. and China's Sinohydro Corporation Ltd. JV, and a Tokyo-based construction company developed the depot's land.

Construction work was divided into eight packages, covering aspects like depots, stations and rolling stock.

Planning
When construction started in 2016, opening was expected by the end of 2019. By 2018, this expectation was still held to, but by 2019, completion of phase one was delayed to December 2021. In 2018, the second phase was expected to be complete by December 2020. Eventually, these dates were pushed back, with phase one opening in 2022 and phase two expected in 2023. The main reason for the delays from 2020 to 2022 was the COVID-19 pandemic.

Cost and length changes 
Originally, the project cost was Tk 21,985 crore but it was later increased by Tk 11,487 to Tk 33,472 crore. The first route, originally projected to start from Uttara, a northern area of Dhaka, to Sayedabad, in the south of the capital, was eventually extended north to Uttara and truncated south to Motijheel. It was planned to have 16 stations originally but it has been increased to 17 stations.

Misconceptions 
The project was originally reported to be a  underground metro rail line. It was later confirmed to be an elevated and underground metro rail project. In 2014, it was reported that 56 trains would run on the metro system. It was confirmed that 24 vehicles would run on the MRT Line-6. It was planned to have six lines.

Trial runs 
MRT Line-6's train made its first run on 29 August 2021. It traveled from Diabari Depot to Mirpur 12. It successfully made its second run on 29 November 2021. It traveled from Uttara to Mirpur 10. The line's train made its longest trial run on 12 December 2021. It traveled from Uttara to Agargaon.

Overview 

All of line 6, save for the depot and some of its accompanying LRT, will be elevated above current roads. Mostly, this will be above road medians to allow traffic flow underneath, with stations also elevated. The Dhaka Metro is projected to serve more than 60,000 passengers per hour by 2022, with headways of approximately 4 minutes. The system plans to use magnetic contactless Integrated Circuit Ticketing, commonly known as smart cards. Platform screen door (PSD) barriers used at the platform level will increase safety and increase efficiency.
Trains of six spacious air-conditioned cars will arrive every four minutes going each way at each of the 16 stations.

The project is being managed by the Communications Ministry's Dhaka Transport Co-ordination Authority, and a consortium of foreign and Bangladeshi firms known as the NKDM Association is acting as the project's general consultant. The NKDM Association consists of Nippon Koei Japan and Development Design Consultants (local consultant - Bangladesh).

Network

Operational

Under construction/planned

Lines

MRT Line-1

Airport Route
Its deadline is set for 2026. It will start from Shahjalal International Airport and stop at Kamalapur Railway Station. The line will have 12 underground stations. Stations will be constructed at Shahjalal International Airport, Shahjalal International Airport Terminal 3, Khilkhet, Jamuna Future Park, Notun Bazar, Uttar Badda, Badda, Hatirjheel East, Rampura, Malibagh, Rajarbagh and Kamalapur Railway Station. MRT Line-1 will have an interchange of MRT Line-6, MRT Line-2 and MRT Line-4 at Kamalapur Railway Station. There will be interchange for the MRT Line-5 Northern Route and the MRT Line-1's Purbachal route at the Nutun Bazar. Hatirjheel East of MRT Line-1 and Aftab Nagar West Station of MRT Line-5: Southern Route will have Interchange. Above all, the airport will have an interchange of MRT Line-1 with BRT Line-3. The government will provide US$1.5 billion while the Japan International Cooperation Agency (JICA) will fund US$4.6 billion. The use of soundless TBMs will make it possible to build MRT-1's underground infrastructure without disrupting the daily lives of residents and businesses.

Purbachal Route
Of these stations, Notun Bazar and Jamuna Future Park would be underground as a part of the airport route.

MRT Line-2

MRT Line-2 will connect Gabtali with Chittagong Road. The stations on this route are - Gabtali, Embankment Road, Basila, Mohammadpur, Lalmatia, Dhanmondi-27, Sat Masjid Road, Jigatola, Dhanmondi-2, Science Laboratory, Elephant Road, New Market, Nilkhet, BUET, Azimpur, Dhaka Medical College. Wari, Motijheel, Arambagh, Kamalapur Railway Station, Mugda, Manda, Demra and finally Chittagong Road. The length of this line will be . It will cost about 3 billion dollars.

MRT Line-4

MRT Line-4 will connect Kamalapur Railway Station with Narayanganj with underground lines. Length of this line will be . According to a survey conducted by Japan International Cooperation Agency (JICA), MRT Line-4 will run parallel to an existing line which will be converted to a dual gauge railway line by the order of the Bangladesh Railway Authority. MRT Line-4 may not be financially viable.

MRT Line-5

Northern Route 
Construction of  MRT Line-5 (Northern Route) will begin in June 2023. MRT Line-5 (Northern Route) will start from Hemayetpur of Savar Upazila and end at Bhatara, costing US$4.85 billion. Northern route will be  underground and  elevated. It will have 14 stations, of which 9 stations will be underground. Those underground stations will be constructed at Gabtoli, Darus Salam, Mirpur 1, Mirpur 10, Mirpur 14, Kachukhet, Banani, Gulshan-2 and Notun Bazar. 5 stations will be elevated. 5 elevated stations will be constructed at Hemayetpur, Baliarpur, Bilamalia, Amin Bazar and Bhatara. MRT Line-5 (Northern Route) will have depot at Hemayetpur of Savar Upazila.

Southern Route 

It will connect Gabtoli with Dasherkandi. The stations on this route are Gabtoli, Technical Circle, Kallyanpur, Shyamoli, College Gate, Asad Gate, Russell Square, West Panthapath, Karwan Bazar, Hatirjheel, Tejgaon, Niketon, Aftabnagar West, Aftabnagar Center, Aftabnagar East and lastly Dasherkandi. It is possible to interchange with MRT 5 (Northern Route).

MRT Line-6

All Line-6 and some attending LRTs, except the depot, have been elevated above the existing roads to allow traffic flow below.

This line consists of three phases, of which only the first is currently operational.

 Opened on 29 December 2022, from Uttara North to Agargaon. 11.73 kilometers (7.29 mi)
 Slated for completion in December 2023, from Agargaon to Motijheel. 8.37 kilometers (5.20 mi)
 Slated for completion in December 2025, from Motijheel to Kamalapur. 1.16 kilometers (0.72 mi)

Service

Fare
Fare chart of Dhaka Metro's Northern Uttara to Agargaon Route.
The fare price given in the fare chart below is in Bangladeshi taka.

See also 
List of megaprojects in Bangladesh
Dhaka Subway
Bangladesh Railway
DHK-CTG Bullet Train

Notes

References

External links 
 Dhaka Metro Rail: At A Glance at Travel Mate Bangladesh
Dhaka Metro Rail Ticket Price Chart
Dhaka Metro Rail Short Video - Inside and Outside of the Train

 
Japan International Cooperation Agency
Public transport in Bangladesh
Rail transport in Bangladesh
Transport in Dhaka
2022 in rail transport
2022 establishments in Bangladesh